Lion Devouring a Rabbit is a c.1855 painting by the French artist Eugène Delacroix, now in the Louvre in Paris.

References

Paintings in the Louvre by French artists
1855 paintings
Paintings by Eugène Delacroix
Lions in art
Rabbits and hares in art